Enrique Serpa (15 July 1900 – 2 December 1968) was a Cuban writer, journalist and photographer born in Havana. His first literary work was Felisa y yo.  

He had a long and solid friendship with Ernest Hemingway, who praised his works.

Bibliography 

 The honey of the hours (poetry), Havana, 1925. 
 Fantoches, Chapter 9, "The crime of yesterday", Havana, 1933. 
 Felisa and I, Havana, 1937. 
 Contraband (novel), Havana, 1938; Prol. by Denia García Ronda, 1975. 
 Days of Trinidad, Álvarez-Pita Editions, Havana. 
 Vitrina, 1923-1925 (verses), Havana, 1940. 
 America at War, Havana, Arrow Press, 1944. 
 Notes on the novel in the USSR, Havana, Publications of the Institute of the Cuban-Soviet Cultural Exchange, 1946. 
 Presence of Spain, Havana, 1947. 
 Party night, Havana, 1951. 
 The trap (novel), Buenos Aires, 1956; Havana, 1972, 1974. 
 illareñas Conference, Santa Clara, 1962. 
 Shark fins (prose notebooks, 2), Havana, 1963. 
 The heroic manigua, Cuban Letters, Havana, 1978.

References

External links  
 Ernest Hemingway and Enrique Serpa: a propitious friendship. - Free Online Library

1900 births
1968 deaths
20th-century Cuban novelists
Cuban journalists
Ernest Hemingway